Velvet Darkness is the first studio album by guitarist Allan Holdsworth, released in 1976 through producer Creed Taylor's CTI Records.

The tracks for the album were originally recorded by engineer Rudy Van Gelder at his Van Gelder Studio in New Jersey. According to Holdsworth, this was done during a rehearsal session, after which the tapes were released by CTI without his or the other band members' consent. None of the musicians involved ever received royalties for their work. Holdsworth therefore considered the album an unauthorised release and not part of his discography.

Critical reception

John W. Patterson of AllMusic gave Velvet Darkness only 1.5 stars out of five, describing it as "an interesting snapshot of young stellar musicians doing their thing in a laid-back but energetic fusion-funk-rock groove", but more for completists and collectors. In his review of Holdsworth's 1982 album I.O.U., he also labelled Velvet Darkness as a "train-wreck disaster" and "infamous".

Reissues
Velvet Darkness was reissued on CD in 1990 through the Epic Associated division of CBS/Columbia Records as part of their "Contemporary Jazz Masters" series. This version was completely remixed and remastered from the original session tapes. The remixing process (which was not indicated within the CD packaging) significantly changed the sound of some instruments, especially the drums. Also included are five alternative takes as bonus tracks.

Track listing

Personnel
 Allan Holdsworth – guitar, violin
 Alan Pasqua – piano
 Alphonso Johnson – bass guitar
 Narada Michael Walden – drums

Production
 Creed Taylor – producer
 Rudy Van Gelder – engineer
 Seiji Kaneko – mastering
 Yoichi Nakao – producer (reissue)

References

Allan Holdsworth albums
1976 debut albums
CTI Records albums
Albums produced by Creed Taylor
Albums recorded at Van Gelder Studio
Unauthorized albums